Taheitia parvula is a species of very small land snail that has an operculum and lives very near saltwater, a maritime terrestrial gastropod mollusc in the family Truncatellidae. This species is endemic to Guam.

References

Fauna of Guam
Truncatellidae
Taxonomy articles created by Polbot